Western Morocco Arabic, Western Moroccan Arabic or ʿAroubi Darija is a dialectal continuum of Hilalian Arabic, mainly spoken in the plains of western (Doukkala, Abda, Tadla, Chaouia, Rhamna, Sraghna, Chiadma and Zaër) and central-western (Saïss, Gharb and pre-Rif) plains of Morocco.

It can be divided into 3 regiolects : northern, central and southern.

See also
 Moroccan Arabic

References

Arabic languages
Moroccan Arabic